Aesch railway station is a railway station in the municipality of Aesch, in the Swiss canton of Basel-Landschaft. It is an intermediate stop on the Basel–Biel/Bienne line and is served by local trains only. The station is on the east side of the river Birs, opposite the Aesch city center.

Services 
Aesch is served by the S3 of the Basel S-Bahn:

 : half-hourly service from Porrentruy or Laufen to Olten.

Gallery

References

External links 
 
 

Railway stations in Basel-Landschaft
Swiss Federal Railways stations